The Football at the 1981 South Pacific Mini Games took place in July 1981.

Group stage

Knockout stage

Bronze medal match

Gold medal match

References

International association football competitions hosted by the Solomon Islands